Sir Paul Patrick Gordon Bateson,  (31 March 1938 – 1 August 2017) was an English biologist with interests in ethology and phenotypic plasticity. Bateson was a professor at the University of Cambridge and served as president of the Zoological Society of London from 2004 to 2014.

Education
Bateson was educated at Westminster School and King's College, Cambridge where he was awarded a Bachelor of Arts degree in zoology in 1960 and a PhD for research on animal behaviour supervised by Robert Hinde.

Career and research
Bateson was a biologist who specialised in researching the behaviour of animals and how it is influenced by genetic and environmental factors. Patrick was a world authority on imprinting in birds — the process of learning to recognise their parents and members of their own species — and his work led to new principles in behavioural development.

Bateson devised original experiments that showed how characteristics of imprinting depend on the bird's early life experiences. Bateson's investigation of learning in birds has led to greater understanding of the neural basis of memory. He had an interest in how developmental and behavioural processes influence evolution.

Bateson was concerned with the ethics of using animals in research and the analysis of animal pain and suffering. This led to a study exploring the effects hunting with hounds had on red deer, an inquiry into dog breeding, and a review of the use of animals in research.

Previous academic positions include a Harkness Fellowship at Stanford University and ten years as head of the Cambridge sub-department of Animal Behaviour. Bateson served five years as biological secretary to the Royal Society and fifteen years as provost of King's College, Cambridge, retiring from both in 2003. He retired from his Cambridge Chair in 2005.

Bateson published on such topics as ethology, animal welfare, behavioral development and evolution.

Selected publications

 Growing Points in Ethology, with Robert Hinde (1976) 
 Mate Choice (1983)
 The Development and Integration of Behaviour (1991)
 Assessment of Pain in Animals (1991)
 Behavioural Mechanisms in Evolutionary Perspective (1992)
 Measuring Behaviour, with Paul Martin (3rd edition 2007)
 The Behavioural and Physiological Effects of Culling Red Deer (1997)
 Perspectives in Ethology (series)
 Design For A Life, with Paul Martin (1999); 2000 hbk ; 2001 pbk  
 Independent Inquiry into Dog Breeding (2010)
 Review of Research using Non-Human Primates (2011)
 Plasticity, Robustness, Development and Evolution, with Peter Gluckman (2011)
 Play, Playfulness, Creativity and Innovation, with Paul Martin (2013)
 Behaviour, Development and Evolution (2017)

Awards and honours
Bateson was knighted for services to science in the 2003 Birthday Honours list. He received an Honorary Doctor of Science (ScD) degree from the University of St Andrews and an Honorary Fellowship from Queen Mary University of London. 

He was elected a Fellow of the Royal Society (FRS) in 1983. In 2014 he received the Frink Medal from the Zoological Society of London.

Personal life
Patrick Bateson's grandfather's cousin was the geneticist William Bateson. Patrick's daughter is Melissa Bateson, also a professor of ethology, at Newcastle University. Patrick Bateson was an atheist. He died on 1 August 2017 at the age of 79.

External links
 
 Interviewed by Alan Macfarlane December 2007 (video)

References

1938 births
2017 deaths
Alumni of King's College, Cambridge
British animal welfare scholars
English biologists
English male non-fiction writers
English science writers
Ethologists
Fellows of King's College, Cambridge
Fellows of the Royal Society
Harkness Fellows
Knights Bachelor
Members of the American Philosophical Society
People associated with The Institute for Cultural Research
People educated at Westminster School, London
Presidents of the Zoological Society of London
Provosts of King's College, Cambridge